Ringo Deathstarr is an American shoegaze band from Austin, Texas, formed by singer/songwriter Elliott Frazier in 2007. The name of the band is a combination of the Beatles drummer Ringo Starr and the Star Wars Death Star.

History
Ringo Deathstarr was started by Frazier in 2007 in his Texas hometown, Beaumont. After he moved to the busier city of Austin, a band lineup stabilized consisting of Frazier, bassist Alex Gehring, guitarist Renan McFarland and drummer Dustin Gaudet. 

The band's debut five-song EP, Ringo Deathstarr, was initially self-released in fall 2007, and then issued on SVC Records in the UK (and later reissued in 2009 by Fan Death Records).

The EP was followed by a string of 7" singles, including "You Don't Listen" (released September 2009 on Custom Made Music), "In Love" (released on September 14, 2009 on SVC), "Tambourine Girl" (the B-side to a split single with the Depreciation Guild, released in 2009 by UK label Club AC30) and "So High" (released on January 31, 2011 by Club AC30).

On November 4, 2009, Japanese label Vinyl Junkie Recordings issued a compilation album, Sparkler, collecting the debut EP, the two tracks from the "In Love" single, and two additional tracks.

The band's debut full-length album, Colour Trip, was first released by Club AC30 on February 14, 2011 in the UK, then licensed to Sonic Unyon for release in North America, and Vinyl Junkie Recordings for release in Japan. By this time, McFarland and Gaudet had departed, and Daniel Coborn had joined on drums. Another EP, Shadow, followed on November 2. They toured with the Smashing Pumpkins in the winter of 2011–2012.

Ringo Deathstarr's second studio album, Mauve, was released on September 19, 2012 by Club AC30, Sonic Unyon and Vinyl Junkie Recordings. It was previewed by the release of the first track, "Rip", as a CD single on September 5 by Vinyl Junkie and a 7" single on September 14 by Club AC30.

The mini-album God's Dream was issued on December 18, 2013. The band's next album, Pure Mood, was released on November 20, 2015, with The Reverberation Appreciation Society taking over as North American distributor.

Style
Ringo Deathstarr has been compared to earlier shoegaze bands such as My Bloody Valentine, Ride, the Jesus & Mary Chain and Medicine. AllMusic described them as "shoegaze revivalists from Texas who play it pretty straight, but aren't afraid to add extra noise to the mix".

Discography

Studio albums
Colour Trip (2011, Club AC30/Sonic Unyon/Vinyl Junkie Recordings)  
Mauve (2012, Club AC30/Sonic Unyon/Vinyl Junkie Recordings)  
God's Dream (2013, Neon Sigh/Noyes Records/Vinyl Junkie Recordings)  
Pure Mood (2015, Club AC30/The Reverberation Appreciation Society/Vinyl Junkie Recordings)
Ringo Deathstarr (2020, Club AC30/Vinyl Junkie Recordings)

EPs
Ringo Deathstarr CD (2007, self-released/SVC Records)
Shadow CD/10" (2011, Club AC30/Vinyl Junkie Recordings)

Singles
"You Don't Listen" 7" (2009, Custom Made Music)
"In Love" 7" (2009, SVC Records)  
"Dream About Me"/"Tambourine Girl" 7" split with the Depreciation Guild (2009, Club AC30)
"So High" 7" (2011, Club AC30)
"Rip" CD/7" (2012, Club AC30/Vinyl Junkie Recordings)

Compilation albums
 Sparkler (2009, Vinyl Junkie Recordings)

References

External links
 

Musical groups established in 2005
Dream pop musical groups
American shoegaze musical groups
Indie pop groups from Texas
Musical groups from Austin, Texas
Noise pop musical groups
2005 establishments in Texas
Sonic Unyon artists